Henryk Rybicki (5 July 1922 – 26 December 1978) was a Polish footballer. He played in three matches for the Poland national football team in 1949.

References

External links
 

1922 births
1978 deaths
Polish footballers
Poland international footballers
Place of birth missing
Association footballers not categorized by position